Linda Molin may refer to:

 Linda Molin (actress) (born 1992), Swedish actress
 Linda Molin (footballer) (born 1992), Swedish footballer